Tuʻakalau Fukofuka, known also as Kalau Fukofuka (born Tonga, date unknown) is a Tongan former rugby union player. He played as prop.

Career
Fukofuka debuted for the Tonga national rugby union team during a match against Fiji in Nuku'alofa on 17 July 1993. He also took part at the 1995 Rugby World Cup, playing all the three pool stage matches in the tournament. His last cap for Tonga was on 15 July 1995 in Suva, also against Fiji.
At club level, Fukofuka played the National Provincial Championship for Auckland and for Northland.

Personal life
He is father of the Crusaders scrum-half Leon Fukofuka.

Notes

External links

Date of birth missing (living people)
Living people
Tongan rugby union players
Rugby union props
Tongan expatriates in New Zealand
Northland rugby union players
Tonga international rugby union players
Year of birth missing (living people)
People educated at St Paul's College, Auckland